The Ministry of Foreign Affairs, also known as MINREX, is the Cuban government ministry which oversees the foreign relations for defense of Cuba as the socialist homeland. It was established on December 23, 1959, instead of the Ministry of State (Ministerio de Estado) to confront the hostile offensive of the United States.

Ministers

See also 
 Council of Ministers of Cuba
 Ministry of the Interior of Cuba (MININT)
 Ministry of Science, Technology and Environment (CITMA)

References

External links 

  Ministry of Foreign Affairs
  Ministerio de Relaciones Exteriores

Foreign Affairs
Foreign relations of Cuba
Cuba